The Austrian National Badminton Championships is a tournament organized to crown the best badminton players in Austria. They have been held since 1958.

Past winners

References

External links
Badminton Europe - Details of affiliated national organisations: Austria

Badminton in Austria
National badminton championships
Recurring sporting events established in 1958
Badminton tournaments in Austria
Badminton